The Atikum, also known as Huamuê or Uamué, are an indigenous people of Brazil that live in Bahia and Pernambuco.

Territory
They have 20 villages within the Atikum Indigenous Land, and their territory is near Carnaubeira da Penha.

History
Known as the "civilized Indians of the Umã Hills," the Arikum sought federal recognition from the Brazilian government beginning in the 1940s.

Language
Today Atikum people speak Portuguese. Formerly they spoke the Atikum language, a linguistic isolate.

References

Indigenous peoples in Brazil
Indigenous peoples of Eastern Brazil